The 1940 United States presidential election in Kentucky took place on November 5, 1940, as part of the 1940 United States presidential election. Kentucky voters chose 11 representatives, or electors, to the Electoral College, who voted for president and vice president.

Kentucky was won by incumbent President Franklin D. Roosevelt (D–New York), running with Secretary Henry A. Wallace, with 57.45 percent of the popular vote, against Wendell Willkie (R–New York), running with Minority Leader Charles L. McNary, with 42.30 percent of the popular vote.

Results

Results by county

References

Kentucky
1940
1940 Kentucky elections